Eide is a former municipality in Møre og Romsdal county, Norway.  It was part of the region of Nordmøre.  It was located on the Romsdal peninsula, along the Kornstadfjorden and the Kvernesfjorden.  The administrative centre of the municipality was the village of Eide.  Other villages included Lyngstad, Vevang, and Visnes.

The municipality was known for its traditional and modern limestone (marble) quarries and related crafts industry. The Atlanterhavsveien coastal road connected Eide Municipality to neighboring Averøy Municipality to the east.  The municipal border lies at the Storseisundet Bridge on the Atlanterhavsveien road.

At the time if its dissolution in 2020, the  municipality is the 353rd largest by area out of the 422 municipalities in Norway. Eide is the 248th most populous municipality in Norway with a population of 3,440.

General information

The municipality of Eide was established on 1 January 1897 when the large Kvernes Municipality was divided into four municipalities : Eide (population: 1,552), Kornstad (population: 1,599), Bremsnes (population: 2,917), and Kvernes (population: 857). During the 1960s, there were many municipal mergers across Norway due to the work of the Schei Committee. On 1 January 1964, the Vevang area (population: 562) was transferred from Kornstad Municipality to Eide Municipality.  On 1 January 1983, the uninhabited island of Eldhusøya (now part of the Atlanterhavsveien) was transferred from Eide to Averøy Municipality.

On 1 January 2020, the neighboring municipalities of Eide and Fræna merged into the new municipality of Hustadvika.

Name
The municipality (originally the parish) is named after the old Eide farm, since the first Eide Church was built there. The name is identical with the word eið which refers to a small valley or a plain which is open in both ends so it forms a transition between two places.

Coat of arms
The coat of arms was granted on 9 July 1982.  The arms show three white whooping swans (Cygnus cygnus), which are very common in the many rich lakes in the area. Each swan has seven feathers, representing the seven main villages in the municipality.

Churches
The Church of Norway had one parish within the municipality of Eide. It is part of the Ytre Nordmøre prosti (deanery) in the Diocese of Møre.

Geography
The municipality is located on the northern part of the Romsdal Peninsula, just west of the island of Averøya.  Kvitholmen Lighthouse lies just off the northern coast of the municipality, in an area with hundreds of small islands and skerries.  Fræna Municipality lies to the west of Eide, Gjemnes Municipality lies to the southeast, and Averøy Municipality lies to the east.  The open Norwegian Sea lies to the north.

Government

The municipal council of Eide was made up of 21 representatives that were elected to four year terms. The party breakdown for the final municipal council was as follows:

See also
List of former municipalities of Norway

References

External links

Municipal fact sheet from Statistics Norway 

 
Hustadvika (municipality)
Nordmøre
Former municipalities of Norway
1897 establishments in Norway
2020 disestablishments in Norway
Populated places disestablished in 2020